Albert Welford Castleman Jr. (January 7, 1936 – February 28, 2017) was an American physicist and chemist who was the Eberly Family Distinguished Chair of Science at Eberly College of Science, Pennsylvania State University. He was elected member of the National Academy of Sciences and fellow of the American Academy of Arts and Sciences, both in 1998. In 2010, Castleman was awarded the  Irving Langmuir Award.

External links
 The Castleman Group at The Pennsylvania State University

References

1936 births
2017 deaths
American physicists
American chemists
Pennsylvania State University faculty
Members of the United States National Academy of Sciences
Fellows of the American Academy of Arts and Sciences